Sylvia Olsen (born 1955 or 1956) is a Canadian writer and public speaker.

Biography 
Olsen was born and raised in a middle-class family in Victoria, British Columbia.

In 1972, Olsen married Carl, who is Coast Salish, and moved to Tsartlip First Nation, where the couple lived for 35 years. During her time in Tsartlip, she raised her three children, began a few small businesses, and began working in the Tsartlip housing department, a passion that led to a number of career developments later on. Also during this time, she began questioning the differences between her privileged upbringing at those of First Nation Canadians. These questions and life experiences have greatly shaped her art.

Later, Olsen's family adopted another son from Brazil, and her children have bore her eight grandchildren, all of whom live in Tsarlip.

Olsen married her current husband, Tex McLeod, when she was 63. They live in North Saanich on Vancouver Island in British Columbia, just north of Tsartlip.

Career 
Olsen has been a founding member at a number of housing organizations for Canadian First Nations communities, including the First Nations Housing & Infrastructure Council for British Columbia, as well as a member of the Assembly of First Nations Chiefs Committee on Housing & Infrastructure.

She also "helped develop the curriculum for and teaches the First Nations Housing Management Certificate Program at Vancouver Island University."

Awards

Publications

Children's books 

 No Time to Say Goodbye: Children's Stories of Kuper Island Residential School, with Rita Morris and Ann Sam (2002)
 Catching Spring (2004)
 Murphy and Mousetrap (2005)
 Yetsa's Sweater (2007)
 Which Way Should I Go?, with Ron Martin, illustrated by Kasia Charko (2008)
 A Different Game (2010)
 Sebastian Sasquatch, illustrated by Kasia Charko (2013)
 Son Who Returns, with Gary Robinson (2014)
 Neekah's Knitting Needles, with Odelia Smith, illustrated by Sheena Lott (2020)

Young adult novels 

 The Girl with a Baby (2003)
 White Girl (2004)
 Just Ask Us (2005)
 Yellow Line (2005)
 Middle Row (2008)
 Counting on Hope (2010)
 Molly's Promise (2013)
 Breathing Fire, with Sarah Yi-Mei Tsiang (2014)

Nonfiction 

 Working with Wool: A Coast Salish Legacy and the Cowichan Sweater (2010)
 knitting stories (2014)
 life cycle of a LIE (2014)
 Growing Up Elizabeth May: The Making of an Activist, with Cate May Burton (2021)
 Unravelling Canada: A Knitting Odyssey (2021)

References

External links 

 Official website

Living people
Writers from British Columbia
21st-century Canadian women writers
21st-century Canadian novelists
Year of birth missing (living people)
21st-century Canadian non-fiction writers
Canadian women novelists
Canadian women non-fiction writers
Canadian children's writers